Being Human is the second studio album by American country music singer Michael Peterson. It was released June 8, 1999 via Reprise Records. The album includes the singles "Somethin' 'bout a Sunday' and "Sure Feels Real Good", which respectively reached #45 and #39 on the Billboard country singles charts. The album itself peaked at #32 on Top Country Albums.

Michael Gallucci of Allmusic rated it two stars out of five, calling it "amiable, if ordinary, country."

Track listing

Chart performance

References

1999 albums
Michael Peterson (singer) albums
Reprise Records albums
Albums produced by Josh Leo